In topology and related areas of mathematics, a product space is the Cartesian product of a family of topological spaces equipped with a natural topology called the product topology.  This topology differs from another, perhaps more natural-seeming, topology called the box topology, which can also be given to a product space and which agrees with the product topology when the product is over only finitely many spaces.  However, the product topology is "correct" in that it makes the product space a categorical product of its factors, whereas the box topology is too fine; in that sense the product topology is the natural topology on the Cartesian product.

Definition
Throughout,  will be some non-empty index set and for every index  let  be a topological space.
Denote the Cartesian product of the sets  by

and for every index  denote the -th  by

The product topology is also called the  because a sequence (or more generally, a net) in  converges if and only if all its projections to the spaces  converge.

Examples

The Cantor set is homeomorphic to the product of countably many copies of the discrete space  and the space of irrational numbers is homeomorphic to the product of countably many copies of the natural numbers, where again each copy carries the discrete topology.

Several additional examples are given in the article on the initial topology.

Properties

The set of Cartesian products between the open sets of the topologies of each  forms a basis for what is called the box topology on  In general, the box topology is finer than the product topology, but for finite products they coincide.

The product space  together with the canonical projections, can be characterized by the following universal property: if  is a topological space, and for every   is a continuous map, then there exists  continuous map  such that for each  the following diagram commutes.

This shows that the product space is a product in the category of topological spaces. It follows from the above universal property that a map  is continuous if and only if  is continuous for all  In many cases it is easier to check that the component functions  are continuous.

In addition to being continuous, the canonical projections  are open maps.

Suppose  is a product of arbitrary subsets, where  for every  If all  are   then  is a closed subset of the product space  if and only if every  is a closed subset of  More generally, the closure of the product  of arbitrary subsets in the product space  is equal to the product of the closures:

Any product of Hausdorff spaces is again a Hausdorff space.

Tychonoff's theorem, which is equivalent to the axiom of choice, states that any product of compact spaces is a compact space. A specialization of Tychonoff's theorem that requires only the ultrafilter lemma (and not the full strength of the axiom of choice) states that any product of compact Hausdorff spaces is a compact space.

If  is fixed then the set

is a dense subset of the product space .

Relation to other topological notions

Separation
 Every product of T0 spaces is T0.
 Every product of T1 spaces is T1.
 Every product of Hausdorff spaces is Hausdorff.
 Every product of regular spaces is regular.
 Every product of Tychonoff spaces is Tychonoff.
 A product of normal spaces  be normal.

Compactness
 Every product of compact spaces is compact (Tychonoff's theorem).
 A product of locally compact spaces  be locally compact. However, an arbitrary product of locally compact spaces where all but finitely many are compact  locally compact (This condition is sufficient and necessary).

Connectedness
 Every product of connected (resp. path-connected) spaces is connected (resp. path-connected).
 Every product of hereditarily disconnected spaces is hereditarily disconnected.

Metric spaces
 Countable products of metric spaces are metrizable spaces.

Axiom of choice

One of many ways to express the axiom of choice is to say that it is equivalent to the statement that the Cartesian product of a collection of non-empty sets is non-empty. The proof that this is equivalent to the statement of the axiom in terms of choice functions is immediate: one needs only to pick an element from each set to find a representative in the product. Conversely, a representative of the product is a set which contains exactly one element from each component.

The axiom of choice occurs again in the study of (topological) product spaces; for example, Tychonoff's theorem on compact sets is a more complex and subtle example of a statement that requires the axiom of choice and is equivalent to it in its most general formulation, and shows why the product topology may be considered the more useful topology to put on a Cartesian product.

See also
 
 
  - Sometimes called the projective limit topology

Notes

References
  
 

General topology
Operations on structures